Gerhard Launer (born 8 January 1949 in Werneck) is one of the best known aerial photographers in Germany.

Life 
Launer was born in 1949 in Werneck. From early on he received violin lessons and was invited at the age of nine by the world-renowned violin soloist and teacher Tibor Varga to spend three months with him at his home in Switzerland.  At the age of fourteen he enrolled at the Conservatory Würzburg to study violin. An accident forced him to give up on his goal to become a musician.

While working for his degree in Graphic Design, he obtained his private pilot license. Later he added the professional pilot license and so combined his two interests, photography and flying and became a professional Aerial Photographer.

His passion is to capture nature's  art in features and structures that are discernible only from the air and to present these in his photos to the public in books and calendars. In 1996 he won first and second prize at the Frankfurt Book Fair, awarded by the German Publishers and Booksellers Association, with his calendars Structures and Wind, Water, Waves. In 2003 Gerhard Launer was featured in the television show Galileo on ProSieben to explain how aerial photography is done. In the spring of 2004 the Knesebeck Publishing House released his first book titled Germany from Above – Day by Day. More books were published. In May 2005 the magazine Stern featured Gerhard Launer with his photo series Beautiful Germany.

Gerhard Launer WFL-GmbH 
Gerhard Launer WFL-GmbH, which specializes in aerial photography (axonometric projection), is based in Rottendorf near Würzburg. Gerhard Launer with his two airplanes and special aerial photography cameras (analog: Lindhof-Aerotechnica, film format 4x5 inch; Hasselblad H2D, resolution 39 Mio Pixel) took photos of nearly all the towns, cities, villages, landscapes and sites of interest in Germany. In addition he has in his archives aerial photos from many countries, including the US.
He employs digital processing and prepares his photos in his own laboratory.

Works

Books
 Germany from Above – Day by Day: Publisher Knesebeck, Munich 2004, Gerhard Launer and Rainer Greubel, 365 color plates, .
 Bavaria from Above: Publisher Knesebeck, Munich 2005, Gerhard Launer, 100 color plates, .
 Hesse from Above: Publisher Knesebeck, Munich 2005, Gerhard Launer, 100 color plates, .
 Flights – The Rems-Murr-District from Above: Publisher Silberburg, Gerhard Launer and Teja Banzhaf, 96p, .
 Northern Germany from Above: Publisher Knesebeck, Munich 2007,Gerhard Launer, 100 color plates
 Germany from Above, narrated for children: Publisher Knesebeck, Munich 2007, Gerhard Launer and Manfred Mai, .
 Germany. Views from Above: Publisher Ellert &Richter, Hamburg 2010, Gerhard Launer, 91 color plates, in three languages, .
 World Heritage – natural site – Mudflats. Views from Above. Publisher Ellert & Richter, Hamburg 2010, Gerhard Launer and Holger Schulz, 69 color plates, .

Calendars
 Wind, Water, Waves: Aerographie ’97, Publisher Dipla, 1997, Gerhard Launer, .
 Structures: Aerographie ’97, Publisher Dipla, 1997, Gerhard Launer
 Calendar Girls: Scheiner Druck and Gerhard Launer, 2004, Benefit Calendar.
 Germany from the Air: Heye, 2005, .
 The World from Above: Publisher Palazzi, 2005
 Germany from Above: Publisher Knesebeck, 2006.
 Germany from Above: Publisher Knesebeck, 2007.
 Germany from Above: Publisher Knesebeck, 2008.
 Bavaria from Above: Publisher Knesebeck, 2006.

Media 
 Photo Technik International: November/December, Nr. 6/98.
 Chip Foto-Video: August 2004.
 Germany: Nr.4/2004, August/September, D7999F.
 "Deutschland" Online - Momente
 Stern Nr. 21, May 13, 2004
 Stern.de - Warum in die Ferne schweifen?
 Stern.de - Deutschland: Traumhafte Luftbilder
 Viva: Nr. 11(217), May 19, 2005
 Galileo: ProSieben, 2 segments about Launer,  broadcast still repeatedly on N24

External links
 Website WFL-GmbH
 www.luftbild-shop.de (aerial photo shop)
 www.deutschlandvonoben.de
 Portraitstudio-Launer
 Knesebeck-Verlag
 AOL.de - The World from Above
 - Vita Gerhard Launer

Aerial photographers
1949 births
Living people
People from Schweinfurt (district)
Photographers from Bavaria